The 1962 Australian Formula Junior Championship was a CAMS sanctioned motor racing title open to Formula Junior racing cars. The championship was contested over a single 30 lap, 60 km race, staged at the Catalina Park circuit at Katoomba in New South Wales, Australia on 28 October 1962. The title, which was the inaugural Australian Formula Junior Championship, was won by Frank Matich, driving an Australian built Elfin.

Results

Race facts:

 Fastest in practice: Frank Matich, Elfin FJ, 1:01.7
 Starters: Seven 
 Winner's race time: 31:18.7
 Fastest race lap: Frank Matich, Elfin FJ, 1:01.1, (New Formula Junior lap record)

References

External links
 The Ed Holly Collection - includes image of the front row starters in the championship race

Australian Formula Junior Championship
Formula Junior Championship